The 2007 Kazakhstan First Division was the 13th edition of Kazakhstan First Division, the second level football competition in Kazakhstan. The division is split into two geographic conferences: North-East and South-West Conferences. Two winners of each conference advance to Final Four tournament, two winners of which then would gain promotion to the Premier League 2008.

Conference final standings

Championship round
All six matches were played on neutral ground in Taldykorgan and Balpyk-Bi. For two teams had identical stats, the champion was revealed after a draw procedure.

References

Kazakhstan First Division seasons
2
Kazakhstan
Kazakhstan